Marion is a city in, and the county seat of, Perry County, Alabama, United States. As of the 2010 census, the population of the city is 3,686, up 4.8% over 2000. First known as Muckle Ridge, the city was renamed for a hero of the American Revolution, Francis Marion.

Two colleges, Judson College and Marion Military Institute, are located in Marion. This is noted in the city's welcome sign referring to Marion as "The College City".

Of the 573 cities in Alabama, Marion is the 152nd most populous.

History

Early history
Formerly the territory of the Creek Indians, Marion was founded shortly after 1819 as Muckle Ridge. In 1822 the city was renamed in honor of Francis Marion, the "Swamp Fox," hero of the American Revolutionary War. Marion incorporated as a town the same year and later became Perry County's second county seat as the hamlet of Perry Ridge was deemed unsuitable. In 1829 it upgraded from a town to a city. The old City Hall (1832) is but one of many antebellum public buildings, churches, and homes in the city today.

General Sam Houston, while between terms as 1st and 3rd president of the Republic of Texas, married Margaret Lea of Marion in the city in 1840.

At the 1844 meeting of the Alabama Baptist State Convention in Marion, the "Alabama Resolutions" were passed. This was one of the factors that led to the 1845 formation of the Southern Baptist Convention in Augusta, Georgia.

Founding of colleges
Judson College, a private, Baptist college for women, was founded in 1838 and closed July 31, 2021. Marion Military Institute was founded in 1887.  Howard College, initially the location of the current Marion Military Institute, was founded in Marion in 1841, and moved to Birmingham in 1887, later becoming Samford University. A groundbreaking school for African Americans, the Lincoln Normal School, was founded here in 1867. The associated Lincoln Normal University for Teachers moved to Montgomery and became Alabama State University. In 1889, Marion Military Institute was chartered by the State of Alabama and today is the oldest military junior college in the nation.

Pre-Civil War
In December 1857, Andrew Barry Moore (1807–1873) of Marion was elected the sixteenth governor of Alabama (1857–1861). He served one term, presiding over Alabama's secession from the Union. Assisting in the war effort, Moore was imprisoned a short time after the war and in ill health returned to Marion, where he died eight years later. George Doherty Johnson (May 30, 1832 – December 8, 1910) served as mayor of Marion in 1856, state legislator from 1857 to 1858 and rose to the rank of brigadier general in the Confederate States Army in the American Civil War.

Civil War era
Nicola Marschall (1829–1917), a German-American artist, is generally credited with designing both the first official Confederate flag and the grey Confederate army uniform while a teacher at the old Marion Female Seminary. With the coming Civil War in 1861, Nicola Marschall was approached in February by Mary Clay Lockett, wife of prominent attorney Napoleon Lockett of Marion, and her daughter, Fannie Lockett Moore, daughter-in-law of Alabama Governor Andrew B. Moore of Marion, to design a flag for the new Confederacy. Marschall offered three designs, one of which became the "Stars and Bars," the first official flag of the Confederate States of America (C.S.A.), first raised in Montgomery, Alabama, on March 4, 1861.

Early 20th century
At the turn of the century in 1900, Perry County peaked in population at 31,783. This is three times the population of the county in the 2010 census.

Hal Kemp, a jazz alto saxophonist, clarinetist, bandleader, composer and arranger was born in Marion in 1904 and died in Madera, California, following an auto accident in 1940. His band was very popular from 1934 until 1939. Major recordings in 1936 include 
"There's a Small Hotel" and "When I'm With You" both number one hits for two weeks. In 1937, his number one hits were "This Year's Kisses", which was number one for four weeks, and "Where or When", number one for one week. Other noted recordings were "Got a Date With an Angel" and "Three Little Fishies". In 1992, Hal Kemp was inducted into the Big Band and Jazz Hall of Fame.

Coretta Scott King, wife of Reverend Dr. Martin Luther King Jr., was born in Marion in 1927 and spent her childhood there. She graduated from Lincoln Normal School as valedictorian in 1945.  The couple got married on the front lawn of her mother's home north of Marion in 1953.

Civil Rights era
A number of significant events occurred in Marion relating to the Civil Rights Movement. In 1958 Jimmy Wilson, a black man, was sentenced to death by a jury in Marion for stealing $1.95 from Estelle Barker.  Wilson's case became an international cause célèbre, covered in newspapers worldwide and inspiring over 1000 letters per day to the office of governor Jim Folsom.  Finally, after the Alabama Supreme Court upheld Wilson's conviction, at the urging of the Congress of Racial Equality, Secretary of State John Foster Dulles wrote to Folsom explaining the damage that the case was doing to the international reputation of the United States and Folsom quickly granted Wilson clemency.

In 1964, Marion was a center of civil rights protests in Alabama. During a Southern Christian Leadership Conference march on the evening of February 18, 1965, during the height of the Selma Voting Rights Movement, Marion resident Jimmie Lee Jackson was shot and killed by Alabama State Trooper James Bonard Fowler.  These events were depicted in the movie Selma, released in 2014. Jackson died on February 26 of an infection stemming from his wounds at nearby Good Samaritan Hospital in Selma. Martin Luther King Jr. preached a sermon at Jackson's funeral on March 3, and Jackson's death is recognized as the catalyst for James Bevel to call and organize the first Selma to Montgomery March on March 7. It was not until 2007 that Fowler was indicted for murder for his role in Jackson's death.  In 2010, Fowler pleaded guilty to a lesser charge of manslaughter.

In 2018, the US Department of the Interior granted Beyond 50 Years – a community non-profit group in Marion – a $500,000.00 grant to convert the historic Perry County Jailhouse into a voting rights museum. The historic jailhouse was the location of Reverend James Orange's incarceration, which sparked the 1965 march that resulted in the death of Jimmie Lee Jackson. The jail is currently under renovation for the conversion into a museum, however a grand opening date has not yet been announced.

Recent events
In 2009, Marion made national news when a three-year-old family feud turned into a 150-man riot outside the town's city hall resulting in the arrest of eight people and the hospitalization of two.

In early 2016, the New York Times reported the city was the center of an outbreak of tuberculosis. In 2014–15 twenty people in the area had contracted active cases of the disease and three had died.

Historical structures

Marion has many historic structures, with most listed on historic registers directly or as contributing buildings. The Chapel and Lovelace Hall at Marion Military Institute, First Congregational Church of Marion, the Henry House, Marion Female Seminary, Phillips Memorial Auditorium, President's House at Marion Institute, Siloam Baptist Church are all individually listed on the National Register of Historic Places. It has one National Historic Landmark, Kenworthy Hall.  The city also has several historic districts, including the Green Street Historic District, Judson College Historic District, Marion Courthouse Square Historic District, and West Marion Historic District.  Historic district buildings of special significance include examples such as Reverie.

Geography

Demographics

2020 census

As of the 2020 United States census, there were 3,176 people, 1,055 households, and 407 families residing in the city.

2010 census
As of the census of 2010, there were 3,686 people, 1,184 households, and 819 families residing in the city. The racial makeup of the city was 63.9% Black or African American, 32.9% White, 0.26% Native American, 0.09% Asian, 0.09% Pacific Islander, 0.26% from other races, and 0.60% from two or more races. 1.9% of the population were Hispanic or Latino of any race.

There were 1,184 households, out of which 31.4% had children under the age of 18 living with them, 38.8% were married couples living together, 25.3% had a female householder with no husband present, and 30.8% were non-families. 28.9% of all households were made up of individuals, and 12.6% had someone living alone who was 65 years of age or older. The average household size was 2.57 and the average family size was 3.17.

In the city, the population was spread out, with 27.5% under the age of 18, 15.7% from 18 to 24, 21.5% from 25 to 44, 18.7% from 45 to 64, and 16.6% who were 65 years of age or older. The median age was 30.7 years. For every 100 females, there were 80.7 males. For every 100 females age 18 and over, there were 72.9 males.

The median income for a household in the city was $24,142, and the median income for a family was $29,663. Males had a median income of $27,422 versus $20,240 for females. The per capita income for the city was $11,934. About 28.4% of families and 33.4% of the population were below the poverty line, including 51.3% of those under age 18 and 15.1% of those age 65 or over.

Notable people

 Lee Cooke, fifty-first Mayor of Austin, Texas
 T. J. Goree, Confederate Lieutenant and aide to Lt. General James Longstreet
 Margaret Lea Houston, third wife of Sam Houston
 Jimmie Lee Jackson, civil rights activist whose shooting death by a state trooper inspired the Selma to Montgomery marches 
 Hal Kemp, jazz bandleader, musician, arranger, and composer
 Coretta Scott King, civil rights activist and wife of Martin Luther King Jr.
 Porter King, thirty-fourth Mayor of Atlanta, Georgia
 Willie McClung, former NFL offensive lineman
 Walthall M. Moore, politician and the first African American to serve in the Missouri state legislature
 Jimmy Wilson, robber whose case received national attention

References

External links

 Alabama Women's Hall of Fame
 Alabama Demographics web site
 Marion Military Institute web site
City of Marion Website
Main Street Marion Website

Cities in Alabama
County seats in Alabama
Cities in Perry County, Alabama
1819 establishments in Alabama